Nógrád (Hungarian; ,  or) was an administrative county of the Kingdom of Hungary. Its territory is now divided between Hungary and Slovakia. The name  is still used in Slovakia as an informal designation of the corresponding territory. The name is derived from the former  castle in Hungary.

Geography

In 1910, Nógrád county shared borders with the counties of Hont, Zólyom, Gömör-Kishont, Heves and Pest-Pilis-Solt-Kiskun. It was situated approximately along the line Poltár, Losonc (today Lučenec), Szécsény and Vác. The river Ipoly (Slovak: Ipeľ) flowed through the county. Its area was 4,133 km2 around 1910.

Capitals

The capital of the county was Balassagyarmat, except for the 18th century, when the capital was Losonc.

History
Nógrád was one of the first counties of the Kingdom of Hungary, founded in the 11th century. Large part of its territory was ruled by the Ottoman Empire from 1541 to 1595, and from 1605 to 1686, as part of Budin Province and Eğri Province.

In the aftermath of World War I, the part of Nógrád county north of the river Ipeľ/Ipoly became part of newly formed Czechoslovakia (as Novohrad county), as recognized by the concerned states in 1920 by the Treaty of Trianon. The southern part stayed in Hungary and was merged with the Hungarian part of Hont county to form Nógrád-Hont County in 1923. Following the provisions of the First Vienna Award, the northern half of the county was redeemed thus and the county had was recreated in 1938. After World War II, the Trianon borders and Nógrád-Hont County were restored. In 1950 the county was again recreated after some of its parts were passed to the newly formed Pest County and the reorganized Heves County.

In 1993, Czechoslovakia dissolved and Novohrad became part of independent Slovakia. Since 1996, it has been part of the Slovak administrative unit Banska Bystrica region.

Demographics

Subdivisions
In the early 20th century, the subdivisions of Nógrád county were:

The municipalities of Lučenec, Fiľakovo and Halič are now in Slovakia.

Notes

References

States and territories established in 1938
States and territories disestablished in 1920
States and territories disestablished in 1923
States and territories disestablished in 1945
Counties in the Kingdom of Hungary
Divided regions